Love Crazy is a studio album by the Amerian R&B band Atlantic Starr, released in 1991. It contained three singles: "Love Crazy" (#75 Pop, #7 R&B), "Masterpiece" (#3 Pop, #3 R&B) and "Unconditional Love" (#38 R&B). The album reached #134 on the Billboard 200 and #25 on the R&B charts.

Production
The album was produced by David Lewis and Wayne Lewis. It contains a mix of ballads and dance tracks. Rachel Oliver joined Atlantic Starr on vocals.

Critical reception

The Chicago Tribune wrote that the album "does provide a solid measure of contemporary R&B." The Buffalo News opined that Oliver "fits in well with Starr's versatile style."

Track listing
 "I Can't Wait" (David Lewis, Wayne Lewis, Mike "Nice" Chapman, Geraldine Sigler, Trent Thomas) - 5:06
 "If You Knew What's Good For You" (David Lewis, Wayne Lewis, Antonina Armato, Danny Sembello) - 4:37
 "Love Crazy" (David Lewis, Wayne Lewis) - 4:46
 "Hold On" (Rich Aronson, Jonathan Lewis, David Brian Oliver) - 4:14
 "Lookin' for Love Again" (Sam Dees, Wayne Lewis) - 5:01
 "Come Lover" (Rich Aronson, Dave Dunn, Jonathan Lewis, Wayne Lewis) - 4:39
 "You Hit the Spot" (David Lewis, Wayne Lewis) - 4:20
 "Masterpiece" (Kenny Nolan) - 4:55
 "Girl, Your Love's So Fine" (David Lewis, Wayne Lewis) - 5:15
 "My Special Lover" (Garry Brown, Wayne Lewis) - 3:56
 "Unconditional Love" (David Lewis, Wayne Lewis) - 5:53

Personnel 
Atlantic Starr
 David Lewis – lead vocals (3, 4, 8, 10, 11), backing vocals (3, 4, 5, 8, 10, 11), keyboards (3, 7), programming (3, 4, 7-11), bass (3, 7-11), drums (3, 7-11), percussion (3, 4, 7-11), guitar (5, 8, 9), electric piano (10), grand piano (11), synthesizers (11), strings (11), bells (11)
 Wayne Lewis – lead vocals (1, 5, 6, 9), backing vocals (1, 3, 5, 6, 8-11), percussion (3, 11), keyboards (5, 8), bass (5), drums (5), arrangements (5), programming (8, 9, 10), synthesizers (8, 9), grand piano (10), strings (10), bells (10)
 Jonathan Lewis – programming (3, 4, 5), percussion (4)
 Rachel Oliver – lead vocals (2, 7, 11), backing vocals (7, 11)

Additional Musicians
 Paul Arnold – programming (1, 3, 5, 6, 7)
 Mike "Nice" Chapman – keyboards (1), drum programming (1), programming (1)
 Tomi Trent – keyboards (1), programming (1)
 Danny Sembello – keyboards (2), programming (2)
 Rich Aronson – strings (2, 9), keyboards (4, 5, 6, 9), bass (4), drums (4), programming (6), synthesizers (8), arrangements (8, 9, 11), horns (9)
 Sam Dees – electric piano (5)
 Dave Dunn – programming (6), guitar (6), bass (6), drums (6)
 Dean Pleasants – guitar (3, 6, 7)
 Norman Brown – guitar (4, 5, 8)
 David Cochrane – guitar (4)
 Doug Grigsby – bass (2)
 Garry Brown – bass (10)
 Gimmie Adney – drums (2)
 Frank Briggs – percussion (3, 11)
 Koran Davis – alto saxophone (4)
 Gene Page – arrangements (3, 5, 8, 11)
 MC Smooth – rap (1)
 Crystal Blake – backing vocals (2)
 Steve Weis – backing vocals (2)

Production 
 David Lewis – producer, executive producer 
 Wayne Lewis – producer, executive producer  
 Mike "Nice" Chapman – co-producer (1), recording (1)
 Tomi Trent – co-producer (1)
 Antonina Armato – co-producer (2)
 Danny Sembello – co-producer (2), recording (2)
 Jonathan Lewis – executive producer 
 Benny Medina – executive producer 
 Paul Arnold – recording (1-11), mixing (1, 6), editing (1, 6, 10)
 Dave Bianco – mixing (2, 4, 9, 11), editing (4)
 Jon Gass – mixing (3, 5, 8, 10), editing (5)
 Keith "K.C." Cohen – mixing (7)
 Jared Held – editing (2, 3, 5, 6, 7, 11)
 Carol Roy – art direction, design 
 Scott Morgan – photography

Studios
 Recorded at GTR Media (Cleveland, Ohio); Music Production Services (Glendale, California); Encore Studios (Burbank, California); Café Al Denté Studios (Santa Monica, California); Sound Castle Recording Studios (Silver Lake, California).
 Mixed at Encore Studios and Elumba Recording Studios (Burbank, California); Can-Am Studios (Tarzana, California); Larrabee Sound Studios (Los Angeles, California).
 Tracks 2, 3 & 7 edited at Encore Studios.

Charts

Weekly charts

Year-end charts

References

Atlantic Starr albums
1991 albums
Reprise Records albums
albums arranged by Gene Page